.brussels is a generic top-level domain for Brussels, Belgium.

See also
.be
.gent
.vlaanderen

References

Computer-related introductions in 2014
Internet in Belgium
Generic top-level domains